Dinesh Arora (born 23 December 1976) is an officer of the Indian Administrative Service, 2002 Kerala cadre, presently pursuing his doctoral studies in public health at Johns Hopkins University. He is former Deputy Chief Executive Officer of the Prime Minister Narendra Modi’s flagship healthcare programme, Ayushman Bharat Yojana, in the Ministry of Health and Family Welfare. Prior to this, he was the Director at NITI Aayog. He was the Founder Mission Director of National Rural Health Mission, Kerala, Founder Managing Director of Kerala Medical Service Corporation Limited (KMSCL), and the first Food Safety Commissioner in the State of Kerala. Arira was also worked as an executive director, Rural Electrification Corporation (REC) and CEO RECPDCL, Ministry of Power, Government of India. Arora is proficient in English, Hindi, Malayalam, Punjabi, and Tamil.

Early life
Arora hails from Chandigarh, Punjab. He completed his early education from DAV School, Panchkula and DAV College, Chandigarh before completed his MBBS in medicine surgery and acquired first division with distinction. His father is a retired Director from Punjab Irrigation, mother is a homemaker, and has two elder sisters. He is married to Ms. Mini Iyer and has two children.

In his free time, Arora plays chess, badminton, and enjoys watching cricket.

Career
Arora cleared the prestigious IAS exam in 2002 and secured All India Rank 5, under which he was allotted the Kerala cadre.

Health 
Arora is a passionate health expert with over 25 years of experience in leading transformational public sector projects in India and southeast Asia. As a medical doctor and IAS officer, he has vast experience of designing and implementing health sector interventions across all levels of administration.

As the State Mission Director, National Rural Health Mission, Kerala, Arora worked for nearly seven years as head of the Health Department, piloting National Health Programs & Health Insurance in Kerala. Kerala has won the shield for best implementation State in Health Insurance schemes (RSBY) for three consecutive years during this time. He commanded a 40,000 strong health staff and was highly successful in filling up critical gaps of human power, infrastructure, med supplies and drugs. He pioneered compulsory rural service for all doctors, restructured nursing cadre, and championed reorganization of Health & Medical cadres and pioneered specialty cadres in health services. He is credited with introducing IT based online reporting and monitoring which was adopted by Government of India as HMIS – Hospital based Monitoring Information System. He also leveraged E- Banking from end to end for all financial transactions in the health programs and mainstreaming AYUSH and Naturopathy alongside starting a multidisciplinary training center for capacity building. 5 public hospitals were accredited with NABH (National Accreditation Board for Hospitals) under his leadership. 20 innovations piloted by me were quoted as best practices by Government of India and the same were implemented in other States of the country.

As director (health) at Niti Ayog, Arora supervised the implementation of National Health Policy including a roadmap for Universal Health coverage with special emphasis on Comprehensive Primary Coverage. He designed public-private partnership framework for demand-side financing scheme and non-communicable diseases as well as the Aspirational District Program for comprehensive reforms in health, nutrition, and education & agriculture for the poorest and vulnerable districts of the country. He also designed a monitoring plan for grant utilization through a portal ‘NGO Darpan’ to track the spending of 10 million dollars annually to 35,000 NGOs. Arora worked closely with CEO, NITI Aayog in implementing special projects aimed towards exploring evidence-based policy solutions to environmental pollution and biomass management, stressed power assets, monitoring sustainable Development Goals.

As the Founder Deputy CEO of the National Health Authority, he spearheaded the world's largest publicly funded health insurance scheme – Ayushman Bharat Pradhan Mantri Jan Aarogya Yojana. He was responsible for developing the overall scheme design including the central elements such as the coverage, target beneficiaries, IT systems, modes of implementation and list of treatments covered under PM-JAY. He led the overall supervision of the strategy and operations division at NHA for Ayushman Bharat PM-JAY. He also supervised multiple facets of the operations including coordination of Central Government with State Governments, formulation of operational guidelines, development of capacity building and information communication frameworks, assessment of strategic purchasing and development of monitoring and anti-fraud mechanisms.

Action against illegal mining
Serving as the Ottappalan Sub-Collector, Arora took stern action against illegal sand-mining in the Bharathapuzha at Ottapalam, Pattambi, Thrithala, and Thiruvananthapuram. The illegal mining of sand was carried out indiscriminately using covert means from ‘kadavus' in the capital district in Kerala. No ‘kadavus' have been approved and no passes have been issued by geologists. In spite of various directions and court orders, the law enforcement agencies had failed to control this illegal activity.
Quoting Shri Arora, The Hindu newspaper mentioned the local bodies that were auctioning sand had failed to stop illegal sand-mining, which had resulted in the destruction of the river.

Strict rules for students’ road safety in Kerala
His campaign in Kerala to ensure that schools comply with safety regulations is highly praised. He took the charge to inforce various safety measures viz. display ‘On school duty' boards on autorickshaws, cars, mini-vans and other hired while transporting students. He also mandated maximum carriage capacity for Autorickshaws, 10 years of driving experience and an EIB driving permit for the drivers. He made it mandatory for school buses to have a fire extinguisher, first-aid box, well-fortified windows, lockable doors and emergency exits. Arora also ordered Regional Transport Officers (RTOs) to impound student carriers violating safety norms after April 1, 2011, and to prosecute their drivers and registered owners.

Ban on illegal mining operations in the quarries in Thiruvananthapuram
Acting as a District Collector and District Magistrate, Dr. Arora banned all the blasting operations leading to illegal and unscientific cutting in the quarries in Thiruvananthapuram to ensure the health and safety of the people. This was followed by constitution of a committee headed by the Additional District Magistrate along the District Geologist and the District Officer of the Kerala State Pollution Control Board (PCB) as members to carry out a safety audit of mining operations in the 181 quarries in the district.

Ensured free and fair polling at Kannur

As the District Collector of Kannur, Arora made the polling at Kannur district in Kerala free and fair by deploying 150 videographers at sensitive booths, all trained to capture critical events on election day, like sealing of electronic voting machines (EVMs), positioning of voting compartments, polling agents, voters waiting in queue at the close of scheduled hour and the last voter in queue, visits of sector officers, the observers and other electoral functionaries. Kannur, otherwise has been one of the most difficult poll pavements during elections.

Formulation of strict guidelines for parading of elephants

In the midst of growing dissonance between Kerala's captive elephants and the mobile-toting population, Arora (the then District Collector of Thiruvananthapuram) formulated a new set of regulations after a district-level meeting to prevent cruelty to elephants under the Kerala Captive Elephants (Management and Maintenance) Rules 2003. The regulations came into effect from May 1, 2011, and it demanded organisers of celebrations using elephants to seek permission from the District Forest Officer, two weeks in advance. The DFO is now required to submit a copy of the permit to the Collector. This permit is based on a certificate issued by the Forest Veterinary Officer or the veterinary surgeon of the Elephant Squad. The DFO has to inspect the mahout's certificate, movement register and other documents to ensure that the elephant to be paraded is free of musth, diseases, injuries and signs of pregnancy, before issuing a permit.

Providing transparency in rural electrification

Arora, who headed the efforts of Government of India in rural electrification has played an instrumental role in formulating the 'Garv App' and also setting up of institutional mechanism of Gram Vidyut abhiyanta. The Garv App was formally unveiled by Power Minister Piyush Goyal in March 2016. 
The mobile app enables GVAs to update photographs of the electrical infrastructure along with GPS coordinates during their visit for monitoring the progress of electrification and map it with pre-defined milestones. As most of the unelectrified villages lack proper network connectivity, so it has been ensured that data can also be captured in ‘offline mode’ and get synced with the server after returning to network area. The mobile app provides a dashboard, which gives an overview of the electrification status of the 18,452 un-electrified villages of the country. It displays the number of milestones achieved, status of the progress state-wise, district-wise and village-wise. One can even track the names of contractors implementing the projects in any un-electrified village, date of award of project at the village level, number of villages visited until date by GVAs, visits undertaken in last seven days, villages electrified in past four weeks etc.

Piyush Goyal during the launch of 'GARV' newsletter for rural electrification felicitated REC executive director Arora for achieving one-third of the rural electrification target by electrifying more than 6,000 villages across the country.

Recognition
In 2013 he received a scholarship from the British Government to attend a course at the London School of Economics and Political Science.

The Chartered Institute of Management Accountants presented Arora with a human resources award.

In 2016 Arora won a badminton tournament in Shillong.

References

1976 births
Living people
Indian Administrative Service officers